This list of Assemblies of God National Fellowships is a list of 144 autonomous associated national groupings of Assemblies of God churches. The information comes from the World Assemblies of God Fellowship.

Africa 
 Angola Assemblies of God
 Assemblies of God in Benin
 Assemblies of God in Botswana
 Assemblies of God in Cameroon
 Assemblies of God in Ethiopia
 Assemblies of God in Gabon
 Assemblies of God in Guinea
 Assemblies of God in Ivory Coast
 Assemblies of God in Mauritius
 Assemblies of God in Mozambique
 Assemblies of God in South Africa
 Assemblies of God in Togo
 Pentecostal Assemblies of God in Zambia
 Assemblies of God of Cape Verde
 Assemblies of God of Madagascar
 Assemblies of God of Niger
 Assemblies of God of Reunion Island
 Assemblies of God of the Democratic Republic of the Congo
 Assemblies of God, Ghana
 Burkina Faso Assemblies of God
 Church of the Assemblies of God of the Congo
 Full Gospel Mission of Cameroon
 General Council of the Assemblies of God Nigeria
 General Council of the Assemblies of God in Zimbabwe
 General Council of the Assemblies of God of Equatorial Guinea
 International Assemblies of God South Africa
 Kenya Assemblies of God
 Lesotho Assemblies of God
 Liberia Assemblies of God
 Malawi Assemblies of God
 Namibia Assemblies of God
 Pentecostal Assemblies of God of Kenya
 Pentecostal Assemblies of Malawi
 Pentecostal Assemblies of Zimbabwe
 Rwanda Pentecostal Assemblies of God
 Senegal Assemblies of God
 Sierra Leone Assemblies of God
 Swaziland Assemblies of God
 Tanzania Assemblies of God
 Uganda Assemblies of God

Asia–Pacific 
 Australian Christian Churches
 Bangladesh Assemblies of God
 Assemblies of God Cook Island
 Assemblies of God of Fiji
 Ecclesia Ministries Limited (Hong Kong)
 Japan Assemblies of God
 Assemblies of God in India
 Gereja Sidang-Sidang Jemaat Allah Indonesia
 Korea
 Assemblies of God of Korea
 Assemblies of God of Korea Yoido General Council
 General Council of the Korea Assemblies of God
 Assemblies of God of Malaysia
 Assemblies of God of Myanmar
 Assemblies of God in New Zealand
 Samoan Assemblies of God in New Zealand
 Tongan Assemblies of God in New Zealand
 Assemblies of God in Pakistan
 Philippines General Council of the Assemblies of God
 District Council of the Assemblies of God in Samoa
 Assemblies of God in American Samoa
 Assemblies of God in Tuvalu
 Assemblies of God Tahiti
 Taiwan Assemblies of God
 Kingdom of Tonga Assemblies of God
 Assemblies of God of Singapore
 Assemblies of God in Sri Lanka
 Assemblies of God in Vietnam

Europe 
 Assemblies of God in Armenia
 United Church of Christians of Evangelical Faith (Belarus)
 Apostolic Church in the Czech Republic
 Assemblies of God of France
 Federation of Pentecostal Churches (Germany)
 Assemblies of God in Great Britain
 Apostolic Church of Pentecost of Greece
 Assemblies of God Ireland
 Assemblies of God in Italy
 Assemblies of God Luxembourg
 United Pentecostal and Evangelical Churches (Netherlands)
 Pentecostal Church in Poland
 Assemblies of God of Portugal
 Assemblies of God in Romania
 Russia
 Russian Assemblies of God
 Union of Pentecostal Christians of Evangelical Faith
 Apostolic Church in the Slovak Republic
 Assemblies of God of Spain
 Swiss Pentecostal Mission

Latin American/Caribbean 
 Assembly of God in Colombia
 Assemblies of God Dominican Republic
 Assemblies of God in Guatemala
 Assemblies of God in Guyana
 Assemblies of God in Haiti
 Assemblies of God in Paraguay
 Assemblies of God in the Bahamas
 Assemblies of God in Uruguay
 Assemblies of God Nicaragua
 Assemblies of God of Bolivia
 Assemblies of God of Chile
 Assemblies of God of Costa Rica
 Assemblies of God of Ecuador
 Assemblies of God of El Salvador
 Assemblies of God of Honduras
 Assemblies of God of Mexico
 Assemblies of God Suriname
 General Convention of the Assemblies of God in Brazil
 General Council of the Assemblies of God in Jamaica
 General Council of the Assemblies of God in Panama
 General Council of the Assemblies of God of Belize
 Union of the Assemblies of God of Argentina

Middle East 
 Jama'at-e Rabbani (Assemblies of God in Iran)

North America 
 Canada
 Canadian Assemblies of God 
 Pentecostal Assemblies of Canada
Pentecostal Assemblies of Newfoundland and Labrador
 Association chrétienne pour la francophonie
 Assemblies of God USA

Bibliography
 Edith Waldvogel Blumhofer, Restoring the Faith: The Assemblies of God, Pentecostalism, and American Culture, University of Illinois Press, USA, 1993
 Margaret M. Poloma, John C. Green, The Assemblies of God: Godly Love and the Revitalization of American Pentecostalism, NYU Press, USA, 2010
 Allan H. Anderson, To the Ends of the Earth: Pentecostalism and the Transformation of World Christianity, Oxford University Press, USA, 2013

References 

Assemblies of God-related lists